The Road Gets Darker from Here is the seventh album by Gallon Drunk, released May 7, 2012, through the Clouds Hill label.

Track listing

Personnel 
Gallon Drunk
Terry Edwards – saxophone, maracas, bass guitar
James Johnston – vocals, guitar, bass guitar, piano, organ
Ian White – drums, maracas, tambourine
Production and additional personnel
Chris Von Rautenkranz – mastering
Johann Scheerer – production

References

External links 
 

2012 albums
Gallon Drunk albums